Crawford County is a county located in the east-central portion of the U.S. state of Missouri. At the 2010 Census, the population was 24,696. Its county seat is Steelville. The county was organized in 1829 and is named after U.S. Senator William H. Crawford of Georgia.

The section of Sullivan which is located in Crawford County is included in the St. Louis, MO-IL Metropolitan Statistical Area.

In 1990, the mean center of U.S. population was located in southwestern Crawford County.

Geography

Adjacent counties
Franklin County (north)
Washington County (east)
Iron County (southeast)
Dent County (south)
Phelps County (west)
Gasconade County (northwest)

Major highways
 Interstate 44
 U.S. Route 66 (1926–1979)
 Route 8
 Route 19
 Route 49

National protected area
Mark Twain National Forest (part)

Demographics

At the 2000 census, there were 22,804 people, 8,858 households and 6,351 families residing in the county. The population density was 31 per square mile (12/km2). There were 10,850 housing units at an average density of 15 per square mile (6/km2). The racial makeup of the county was 98.26% White, 0.14% Black or African American, 0.43% Native American, 0.13% Asian, 0.06% Pacific Islander, 0.14% from other races, and 0.82% from two or more races. Approximately 0.77% of the population were Hispanic or Latino of any race.

There were 8,858 households, of which 32.80% had children under the age of 18 living with them, 58.70% were married couples living together, 9.00% had a female householder with no husband present, and 28.30% were non-families. 24.30% of all households were made up of individuals, and 11.30% had someone living alone who was 65 years of age or older. The average household size was 2.53 and the average family size was 3.00.

26.30% of the population were under the age of 18, 7.90% from 18 to 24, 26.90% from 25 to 44, 23.10% from 45 to 64, and 15.80% who were 65 years of age or older. The median age was 38 years. For every 100 females there were 97.30 males. For every 100 females age 18 and over, there were 94.60 males.

The median household income was $37,554 and the median family income was $45,059. Males had a median income of $28,005 compared with $18,736 for females. The per capita income was $18,203. About 12.70% of families and 16.30% of the population were below the poverty line, including 23.30% of those under age 18 and 14.10% of those age 65 or over.

2020 Census

Education

Public schools
Crawford County R-I School District - Bourbon
Bourbon Elementary School (PK−4)
Bourbon Middle School (5−8)
Bourbon High School (9–12)
Crawford County R-II School District - Cuba 
Cuba Elementary School (K−4)
Cuba Middle School (5−8)
Cuba High School (9–12)
Steelville R-III School District - Steelville
Steelville Elementary School (PK−4)
Steelville Middle School (5−8)
Steelville High School (9–12)

Private schools
Meramec Valley Christian School - Sullivan - Baptist - (PK–12)
Holy Cross Catholic School - Cuba, Missouri - Catholic - (PK−8)

Public libraries
 Bourbon Branch Library  
Recklein Memorial Branch Library 
 Steelville Branch Library

Politics

Local
The Republican Party controls politics at the local level in Crawford County. Republicans hold all elected positions in the county.

State

Crawford County is split between two of the districts that elect members of the Missouri House of Representatives, both of which are currently represented by Republicans.
District 62 — Tom Hurst (R-Meta). Consists of the northwest corner of the county.

District 120 — Jason Chimpman (R- Steelville). Consists of almost of the county.

In the Missouri Senate, all of Crawford County is a part of Missouri's 16th District and is represented by Republican Justin Brown.

Federal

All of Crawford County is included in Missouri's 8th Congressional District and is currently represented by Republican Jason T. Smith of Salem in the U.S. House of Representatives. Smith won a special election on Tuesday, June 4, 2013, to complete the remaining term of former Republican Jo Ann Emerson of Cape Girardeau. Emerson announced her resignation a month after being reelected with over 70 percent of the vote in the district. She resigned to become CEO of the National Rural Electric Cooperative.

Political culture

Crawford County is like most rural counties, socially conservative and vote in favor of the Republican Party. Bill Clinton was the last Democratic presidential nominee to win Crawford County in 1996. Since then, voters in the county have substantially supported Republicans at the national level.

2008 Missouri presidential primary
In the 2008 Missouri Presidential Primary, voters in Crawford County from both political parties supported candidates who finished in second place in the state at large and nationally.

Republican
Former Governor Mike Huckabee (R-Arkansas) won Crawford County by just one vote with 32.71 percent of the vote. U.S. Senator John McCain (R-Arizona) finished in second place in Crawford County with 32.66 percent. Former Governor Mitt Romney (R-Massachusetts) came in third place, receiving 27.76 percent of the vote while libertarian-leaning U.S. Representative Ron Paul (R-Texas) finished fourth with 5.15 percent.

Democratic
Then-U.S. Senator Hillary Clinton (D-New York) won a decisive victory in Crawford County with 66.36 percent of the vote. Then-U.S. Senator Barack Obama (D-Illinois) received 30.07 percent of the vote from Crawford County Democrats. Although he withdrew from the race, former U.S. Senator John Edwards (D-North Carolina) still received 2.61 percent of the vote in Crawford County.

Communities

Cities and towns

Bourbon
Cook Station
Cuba
Leasburg
St. Cloud
Steelville (county seat)
Sullivan (partial)
West Sullivan

Census-designated place
Indian Lake

Unincorporated communities

 Argo
 Berryman
 Butts
 Cherry Valley 
 Cherryville
 Coffeyton
 Czar
 Davisville
 Delhi
 Dillard
 Elayer
 Fanning
 Harrison Mills
 Hinch
 Hofflins
 Huzzah
 Iron Center
 Jake Prairie
 Keysville
 Midland
 Oak Hill
 Patsy
 Scotia
 Service
 Wesco
 Westover

Townships

 Benton
 Boone
 Courtois
 Knobview
 Liberty
 Meramec
 Oak Hill
 Osage
 Union

See also
National Register of Historic Places listings in Crawford County, Missouri

References

External links
 Digitized 1930 Plat Book of Crawford County  from University of Missouri Division of Special Collections, Archives, and Rare Books

 
Missouri counties
1829 establishments in Missouri
Populated places established in 1829